African Banking Corporation Building (simply ABC Building) is an unbuilt  skyscraper in Zvishavane, Zimbabwe. It was planned to be finished in 1976. If completed, it would have been the tallest structure in Zimbabwe.

See also
 List of tallest buildings in Zimbabwe

References

Buildings and structures in Midlands Province
Zvishavane District